Karikkode Bhagavathy Temple is a Hindu temple located in the village of Karikkode near Thodupuzha in Idukki district in the Indian state of Kerala. The structure is believed to be 460 years old.

Temple 
Goddess Bhadrakali/Bhagavathy presides there. The idol installed there is a 'Shilakkannadi' one, which faces west. Three poojas are held daily, abided by Kaviyadu thanthra. Other subordinate deities are Shiva and Ganapathi. The annual festival is hosted in the Malayalam month of 'Kumbham' during the Ashwathy and Bharani days.

History 
Vadakkumkoor raja underwent a long penance and prayers and brought Kodungallor Bhagavathy to the temple.

References 

Hindu temples in Idukki district
Bhagavathi temples in Kerala